Selfless Gaming was an American esports organization with teams competing in Counter-Strike: Global Offensive, Killer Instinct, Overwatch and Rocket League.

The team was formed by former Enemy eSports CS:GO members on February 21, 2016. Selfless's CS:GO team ELeague Season 1 after Tyloo was unable to obtain visas in team.

Longtime lineup member Skyler “Relyks” Weaver left the lineup on August 25, 2016.

Killer Instinct

Roster 
 Damien "Fiyah Liger" Walton

Counter-Strike: Global Offensive

Tournament results 
 19th-24th — ELeague season 1

Overwatch

Roster 
 Jay "sinatraa" Won
 Daniel "Dafran" Francesca
 Bobby "Kresnik" Wierner
 Jeff "emongg" Anderson
 Michael "Michael3D" Wilbanks
 Daniel "dhaK" Martinez Paz

Rocket League

Roster 
 Chris "Dappur" Mendoza
 Jesus "Mijo" Gutierrez
 Branden "Pluto" Schenetzki
 Timi "Timi" Falodun

References

External links 
 

Defunct and inactive Counter-Strike teams
Fighting game player sponsors
Rocket League teams
Super Smash Bros. player sponsors
Defunct and inactive Overwatch teams
2016 establishments in the United States
2017 disestablishments in the United States
Esports teams established in 2016
Esports teams disestablished in 2017